Kosair for Kids is a nonprofit organization based in Louisville, Kentucky. Founded in 1923, the organization helps children with medical conditions in Kentucky and southern Indiana. It ran the Kosair Cripple Children Hospital until 1982 and subsequently partnered with Norton Healthcare to run Kosair Children’s Hospital until 2016. The group partners with over 100 pediatric organizations in the area to provide assistance to youth in the area.

History 
A division of the Kosair Shriners since 1923, Kosair for Kids has operated as a nonprofit organization helps children with medical conditions in Kentucky and southern Indiana. The charity is headquartered in the former Kosair Crippled Children Hospital at 982 Eastern Parkway in Louisville, Kentucky. The hospital was run as a pediatric hospital until 1982. Kosair closed its hospital to help pay for a new one downtown with Norton Healthcare that was named Kosair Children's Hospital until 2016.

Work 
Various causes that Kosair for Kids has contributed to include hospital funding and having a school for the blind and a school for children with autism. They host an events for children with medical problems and help with children's with medical expenses. Kosair for Kids partners with over 100 pediatric organizations in the area to provide assistance to youth in Kentuckiana.

See also 
 Kosair Shrine Circus
 Shriners Hospitals for Children
 Royal Masonic Hospital
 Old Scottish Rite Hospital building

References

External links
 Official site

Children's charities based in the United States
Non-profit organizations based in Louisville, Kentucky
1923 establishments in Kentucky
Charities based in Kentucky
Organizations established in 1923
Shriners